Arroyo Dolores (Spanish for Our Lady of Sorrow Creek) is a river in San Francisco, California that has been largely culverted. The only remaining portion above ground is in the Mission Creek Channel that drains into China Basin.

Notes

Rivers of San Francisco
Rivers of Northern California
Tributaries of San Francisco Bay